Der Schinderhannes is a 1958 film directed by Helmut Käutner, starring Curd Jürgens and Maria Schell. It was also known as Duel in the Forest. The story depicts the life of the 18th century outlaw Schinderhannes. It is based on a 1927 play Schinderhannes by Carl Zuckmayer.

Reception
According to MGM records the film earned $175,000, making a loss to the studio of $49,000.

See also
 The Prince of Rogues (1928)

References

External links

Der Schinderhannes at New York Times

1958 films
1950s adventure drama films
1950s historical films
German adventure drama films
German historical films
Biographical films about bandits
German films based on plays
Films based on works by Carl Zuckmayer
Films set in the 18th century
Films directed by Helmut Käutner
Metro-Goldwyn-Mayer films
West German films
Hunsrück
Remakes of German films
1958 drama films
1950s German films